The following is a list of squads for each nation competing at the second FIFA U-17 Women's World Cup in Trinidad and Tobago.

Ages and club as of 5 September 2010.

Group A

Chile
Coach:  Ronnie Radonich

Nigeria

Coach: Peter Dedevbo

North Korea

Coach: Ri Song-gun

Trinidad and Tobago
Coach  Even Pellerud

Group B

Germany
Coach  Ralf Peter

South Korea
Coach: Choi Duck-joo

Mexico
Coach:  Saúl Reséndiz

South Africa
Coach: Solomon Luvhengo

Group C

Spain
Head coach: Jorge Vilda

Japan
Head coach: Hiroshi Yoshida.

New Zealand
Coach  Dave Edmondson

Venezuela
Head coach:  Kenneth Zseremeta

Group D

Brazil
Head coach: Edvaldo Erlacher

Canada
Coach  Bryan Rosenfeld

Ghana
Head coach: Abrahams Allotey

Republic of Ireland
Coach  Noel King

References

External links
 2010 FIFA U-17 Women's World Cup squad lists

2010
2010 in youth sport